Heneage Finch, 3rd Earl of Aylesford (6 November 1715 – 9 May 1777), styled Lord Guernsey between 1719 and 1757, was a British peer and politician.

Background and education

Finch was the son and heir of Heneage Finch, 2nd Earl of Aylesford by his wife Mary Fisher, daughter and heiress of Sir Clement Fisher, 3rd Baronet of Packington Hall, Warwickshire. He was educated at University College, Oxford.

Political career
As Lord Guernsey, he sat as Member of Parliament for Leicestershire from 1739 to 1741
and for Maidstone from 1741 to 1747 and again from 1754 to 1757. The latter year he succeeded his father in the earldom and entered the House of Lords.

Family
Lord Aylesford married Lady Charlotte, daughter of Charles Seymour, 6th Duke of Somerset, in 1750. She was reputed to be worth £50,000. They had twelve children:
Heneage Finch, 4th Earl of Aylesford (1751–1812)
Hon. Charles Finch (1752–1819)
Adm. Hon. William Clement Finch (25 May 1753 – 30 September 1794), married Mary Brouncker on 2 August 1789 and had issue
Lady Charlotte Finch (13 May 1754 – 7 July 1808), married Henry Howard, 12th Earl of Suffolk on 14 August 1777 and had issue
Capt. Hon. John Finch (22 May 1755 – 29 June 1777), Coldstream Guards, mortally wounded at the Battle of Short Hills
Gen. Hon. Edward Finch (26 April 1756 – 27 October 1843)
Rev. Hon. Daniel Finch (3 April 1757 – October 1840), prebendary of Gloucester and Fellow of All Souls'
Capt. Hon. Seymour Finch (11 June 1758 – 2 February 1794), RN
Hon. Henry Allington Finch (26 February 1760 – 19 November 1780)
Lady Frances Finch (9 February 1761 – 21 November 1838), married George Legge, 3rd Earl of Dartmouth on 29 September 1782 and had issue
Lady Maria Elizabeth Finch (7 October 1766 – 20 October 1848)
Lady Henrietta Constantia Finch (3 June 1769 – 1814)

Lord Aylesford died at Grosvenor Square, Mayfair, London, in May 1777, aged 61, and was succeeded in the earldom by his eldest son, Heneage. The Countess of Aylesford died at Aylesford, Kent, in February 1805, aged 74.

References

1715 births
1777 deaths
3
Heneage
Alumni of University College, Oxford
Guernsey, Heneage Finch, Lord
Guernsey, Heneage Finch, Lord
Guernsey, Heneage Finch, Lord
Guernsey, Heneage Finch, Lord